Maria Paola Turcutto (born 2 January 1965) is a road cyclist from Italy. She represented her nation at the 1992 Summer Olympics in the women's road race.

References

External links
 profile at sports-reference.com

Italian female cyclists
Italian mountain bikers
Cyclists at the 1992 Summer Olympics
Olympic cyclists of Italy
Living people
Cyclists from Rome
1965 births